The Sound of Last Night... This Morning is a live compilation album by Ben Folds.

Track listing
 "Free Coffee" - 3.23
 "Errant Dog" - 2.31
 "Lovesick Diagnostician" - 3.23
 "Dr. Yang" - 2.41
 "Kylie from Connecticut" - 5.05
 "Free Coffee Town" - 2.50
 "Lovesick Diagnostician" - 3.03
 "Bitch Went Nutz" - 4.36
 "Frowne Song" - 4.49
 "Cologne" - 6.05
 "Way to Normal" - 2.52
 "Brainwascht" - 4.04
 "Effington" - 3.51
 "Annie Waits" - 4.07
 "You to Thank" - 3.52
 "One Angry Dwarf and 200 Solemn Faces" - 3.54

Ben Folds albums
2009 live albums
2009 compilation albums